Butt Rockin'  is the third studio album by Texas-based blues rock band The Fabulous Thunderbirds, released in 1981. The recording took the band closer to old rhythm and blues and added additional musicians playing piano and brass. A 2000 CD reissue contains three bonus tracks.

Track listing 
All tracks composed by Kim Wilson; except where indicated
 "I Believe I'm in Love"
 "One's Too Many (And a Hundred Ain't Enough)" (Wilson, Nick Lowe)
 "Give Me All Your Lovin
 "Roll, Roll, Roll" (Eddie Shuler, Lonnie Brooks)
 "Cherry Pink and Apple Blossom White" (Louiguy, Jacques Larue, Mack David)
 "I Hear You Knockin (J.D. Miller)
 "Tip on In" (Robert Holmes, James Moore, John Holmes)
 "I'm Sorry"
 "Mathilda" (Huey Thierry, George Khoury)
 "Tell Me Why"
 "In Orbit" (Wilson, Jimmie Vaughan, Keith Ferguson, Fran Christina)

Bonus tracks
 "Found a New Love"
 "I Got Eyes" (Johnny "Guitar" Watson)
 "Someday You'll Want Me" (Dave Bartholomew, Pearl King)

Personnel
The Fabulous Thunderbirds
Kim Wilson - vocals, harmonica
Jimmie Vaughan - guitar
Keith Ferguson - bass
Fran Christina - drums
with:
Al Copley - piano
Greg Piccolo - tenor saxophone
Doug James - baritone saxophone
Anson Funderburgh - second guitar on "Tip on It"

References

External links
Official Site

1981 albums
The Fabulous Thunderbirds albums
Chrysalis Records albums
Albums produced by Denny Bruce